The Marriage-Go-Round is a 1958 play written by Leslie Stevens. The 1961 film adaptation of the same name, written and produced by Stevens, stars Susan Hayward, James Mason and Julie Newmar, who reprised her role from the play.

The play was inspired by a suggestion that dancer Isadora Duncan supposedly made to playwright George Bernard Shaw: The two of them should have a child because "with your mind and my body, think what a person it would be!"  The play, a sex comedy, was a Broadway theatre success with a run of over 700 performances; it did poor box office .

Play
The play's original production on Broadway starred Charles Boyer as	Dr.
Paul Delville, a professor of cultural anthropology at a New York college, 
Claudette Colbert as Dr. Content Lowell, the Dean of Women at the college and Delville's wife, Julie Newmar as Katrin Sveg, and Edmon Ryan as Ross Barnett.

Reception
Brooks Atkinson of The New York Times called the Broadway production at the  Plymouth Theatre "droll and buoyant" and its direction by Joseph Anthony "immaculate."

At the 13th Tony Awards, Newmar won for her performance as Featured Dramatic Actress and Colbert received a Tony nomination for her performance as a Dramatic Actress.  Colbert lost to Gertrude Berg, who won for her performance in A Majority of One.

The play was in part a success due to charity theater parties, such as one sponsored by Maternity Center Association, which bought all seats for one night's performance in November 1958, paying $5,700 and netting $16,000 after selling tickets to its members that were priced between $10 and $30.

References

External links
 The Happy Hack, a September 28, 1959 Time magazine article about Leslie Stevens
 
 

Comedy plays
American plays
1958 plays
Broadway plays